Tony Kenneth Burris (May 30, 1929 – October 9, 1951) was a Choctaw soldier in the United States Army during the Korean War. He posthumously received the Medal of Honor for his actions on October 8–9, 1951, during the Battle of Heartbreak Ridge.

He is buried in Blanchard Cemetery, Blanchard, Oklahoma. His grave can be found at GPS (lat/lon): 35.1591, -97.65226.

Awards and decorations
Burris's awards include:

Medal of Honor citation

Citation:

Sfc. Burris, a member of Company L, distinguished himself by conspicuous gallantry and outstanding courage above and beyond the call of duty. On 8 October, when his company encountered intense fire from an entrenched hostile force, Sfc. Burris charged forward alone, throwing grenades into the position and destroying approximately 15 of the enemy. On the following day, spearheading a renewed assault on enemy positions on the next ridge, he was wounded by machine gun fire but continued the assault, reaching the crest of the ridge ahead of his unit and sustaining a second wound. Calling for a 57mm. recoilless rifle team, he deliberately exposed himself to draw hostile fire and reveal the enemy position. The enemy machine gun emplacement was destroyed. The company then moved forward and prepared to assault other positions on the ridge line. Sfc. Burris, refusing evacuation and submitting only to emergency treatment, joined the unit in its renewed attack but fire from hostile emplacement halted the advance. Sfc. Burris rose to his feet, charged forward and destroyed the first emplacement with its heavy machine gun and crew of 6 men. Moving out to the next emplacement, and throwing his last grenade which destroyed this position, he fell mortally wounded by enemy fire. Inspired by his consummate gallantry, his comrades renewed a spirited assault which overran enemy positions and secured Hill 605, a strategic position in the battle for "Heartbreak Ridge", Sfc. Burris' indomitable fighting spirit, outstanding heroism, and gallant self-sacrifice reflect the highest glory upon himself, the infantry and the U.S. Army.

See also

List of Korean War Medal of Honor recipients
List of Native American Medal of Honor recipients

References

 

1929 births
1951 deaths
Choctaw Nation of Oklahoma people
People from Blanchard, Oklahoma
United States Army non-commissioned officers
American military personnel killed in the Korean War
United States Army Medal of Honor recipients
Korean War recipients of the Medal of Honor
United States Army personnel of the Korean War
Native American United States military personnel